An active database is a database that includes an event-driven architecture (often in the form of ECA rules) which can respond to conditions both inside and outside the database.  Possible uses include security monitoring, alerting, statistics gathering and authorization.

Most modern relational databases include active database features in the form of database triggers.

References

Types of databases
Department of Computer Science, University of Manchester